The Global South Fellowship of Anglican Churches (GSFA), formerly known as Global South (Anglican), is a communion of 25 Anglican churches, of which 22 are provinces of the Anglican Communion, plus the Anglican Church in North America and the Anglican Church in Brazil. The Anglican Diocese of Sydney is also officially listed as a member.

The provinces identified with the Global South represent most of the Southern Hemisphere and Third World provinces within the Anglican Communion, including all those from Africa, the largest from South America, most from Asia and two Oceania provinces. Global South provinces are characterized by their theological conservatism on matters of sexual ethics and life issues, and by their evangelicalism in churchmanship.

The GFSA excludes the Episcopal Anglican Church of Brazil, the Anglican Church of Australia and the Anglican Church in Aotearoa, New Zealand and Polynesia, despite the fact that some Australian and New Zealand dioceses were already represented in their meetings, and the Asian provinces of Japan and Korea. The Anglican Church of Southern Africa is officially associated to the Global South and was already represented in several meetings. The Diocese of South Carolina, which left the Episcopal Church in October 2012, was accepted into Global South in August 2014 with the Global South temporarily caring for the diocese until 2018, when the now-Anglican Diocese of South Carolina formally joined the Anglican Church in North America following the two formal votes.

History
The Global South encounters started in 1994. The Global South standing gained impetus concerning the controversies over the acceptance of non-celibate homosexuality, as the blessing of same-sex unions and the allowing of non-celibate homosexual clergy was being promoted by the Episcopal Church in the United States and the Anglican Church of Canada. The apex of the controversy took place with the consecration of Gene Robinson, a partnered homosexual, as bishop of the Episcopal Church in 2003. The Global South churches have since then vigorously opposed the legitimacy of any acceptance of same-sex relationships within the Anglican Communion.

Several of the Global South primates attended the Global Anglican Future Conference that took place in Jerusalem in 2008, as an alternative to the Lambeth Conference. Mouneer Anis the Presiding Bishop of Jerusalem and the Middle East, personally objected to attending GAFCON 2008, believing that "the Global South must not be driven by an exclusively Northern agenda or Northern personalities."

Following this conference, the Global South supported the creation of the Anglican Church in North America, in 2009, as a province in formation of the Anglican Communion and a theologically conservative alternative in the United States and Canada in opposition to what were viewed as revisionist departures that had taken place in these provinces concerning specifically human sexuality and the interpretation of the Bible. Archbishop Robert Duncan of the Anglican Church in North America was present at the Global South Primates Encounter that took place in Singapore, on 19–23 April 2010. The final statement declared: "We are grateful that the recently formed Anglican Church in North America (ACNA) is a faithful expression of Anglicanism. We welcomed them as partners in the Gospel and our hope is that all provinces will be in full communion with the clergy and people of the ACNA and the Communion Partners."

The Global South issued a letter to the Crown Nominations Commission of the Anglican Communion, on 20 July 2012, signed by 13 primates and representatives of other three churches, including the Anglican Church of Southern Africa, expressing the wish that the new Archbishop of Canterbury will remain faithful to the orthodoxy of the Anglican faith and work for the unity of the worldwide Anglican Communion.

The 7th Global South Conference, held in Cairo, Egypt, on 8–11 October 2019, reuniting 101 delegates and observers of 18 Anglican provinces, proposed the creation of the Global South Fellowship of Anglican Churches, with the GSFA Covenantal Structure, which was then approved on their official communiqué. The 8th Global South Conference, also held in Cairo, except that online, on 14–17 October 2021, with the presence of 90 delegates from 16 provinces and a diocese, endorsed the Global South Fellowship of Anglican Churches "as a global body of orthodox Anglicans within the Anglican Communion. It retains its geographical anchorage in the provinces of the traditional “Global South”, nurtures its koinonia in the Gospel". It was also decided that in the next conference, "membership in the Global South Fellowship will be based on assent to the Fundamental Declarations of the Covenantal Structure and agreement with the conciliar structures that bind us together as an ecclesial body." On the same occasion, Justin Badi Arama, Archbishop of South Sudan, was elected as chairman.

On 9 February 2023, the Global South Fellowship questioned Justin Welby's "fitness to lead" the Anglican Communion following the Church of England's vote on same-sex blessings. A day later, the Church of Uganda began the process to separate from the Archbishop of Canterbury. On 20 February 2023, some Primates within the fellowship released a statement declaring that it had broken communion with and no longer recognized Justin Welby as primus inter pares of the Anglican Communion, de facto marking a schism within the Anglican Communion. In March, 2023, the Anglican Church of Southern Africa, a member province, released a statement saying that, while they could not approve of blessings or marriage for same-sex couples, they would "prepare formal prayers suitable for providing pastoral care to couples in same-sex civil unions."

Provinces
The Global South Fellowship of Anglican Churches official website lists 24 provinces and a diocese as 25 members:
Episcopal/Anglican Province of Alexandria
Church of Bangladesh (United)
Anglican Church in Brazil
Province of the Anglican Church of Burundi (CAPA)
Church of the Province of Central Africa (CAPA)
Anglican Church of Chile
Province of the Anglican Church of the Congo (CAPA)
Church of the Province of the Indian Ocean (CAPA)
Anglican Church of Kenya (CAPA)
Church of Melanesia
Church of the Province of Myanmar
Church of Nigeria (CAPA)
Anglican Church in North America
Church of Pakistan (United)
Anglican Church of Papua New Guinea
Province of the Anglican Church of Rwanda
Church of the Province of South East Asia
Anglican Church of Southern Africa (CAPA)
Anglican Church of South America
Anglican Diocese of Sydney
Province of the Episcopal Church of Sudan (CAPA)
Province of the Episcopal Church of South Sudan (CAPA)
Anglican Church of Tanzania (CAPA)
Church of Uganda (CAPA)
Church of the Province of West Africa (CAPA)

See also

Anglican Church in North America
Anglican Mission in the Americas
Anglican realignment
Convocation of Anglicans in North America
Fellowship of Confessing Anglicans
Global Anglican Future Conference
Windsor Report

References

External links
GFSA website

Anglicanism by continent
Anglicanism in Africa
Anglicanism in Asia
Anglicanism in Oceania
Anglican Church in the Caribbean
Anglican Church in North America
Anglican realignment
Anglican organizations established in the 21st century
Christian organizations established in 2005